Alanyaspor Kulübü is a Turkish professional football club located in the city of Alanya in Antalya Province. Formed in 1948, the club colours are orange and green. Home matches are played at Kırbıyık Holding Stadium.

History

Alanyaspor club was founded in 1948 by Doctor Ali Nazım Köseoğlu and a group of young people. The club was initially known as Alanya Kalespor and later changed its name to Kale Gençspor. The first jersey color chosen was blue and white. The club continued to operate in a semi-federal status until 1966, when it gained federated status in the 1965-66 season. That same season, Alanyaspor joined the Antalya Amateur Cluster for the first time, playing in red and white colors.

In May 1982, under the chairmanship of Hüseyin Arıkan, the head of the new administration, the club changed its name to Alanyaspor and adopted the current colors of orange and green. This change was made following a bylaws change. In the 1984-85 season, with the establishment of the Turkish 3rd league, Alanyaspor was included in the 3rd League. This marked a significant milestone for Alanya, as it gained its first football team playing in professional leagues. During this period, the construction of Alanya Stadium, which had been ongoing for several years, was finally completed.

Prior to the 2014-15 season, Alanya team signed a name sponsorship agreement with Albimo company and competed that season in the 1st League under the name Albimo Alanyaspor. Despite finishing in third place in the 2014-15 season, the team was knocked out by Samsunspor in the first match of the play-off battle, losing its chance to qualify for the Super League.

In the 2015-16 season, the club changed its name sponsor and was renamed Multigroup Alanyaspor. After eliminating Balıkesirspor in the first round, Alanyaspor faced Adana Demirspor in the final. Alanyaspor won the match 3-1 on penalties and secured a place in the Super League for the first time in its history.

During the 2016-17 season, the club's name was changed to Aytemiz Alanyaspor as part of a new sponsorship agreement. This sponsorship deal lasted until the end of the 2021-2022 season.

Statistics

Domestic leagues affiliation
 Süper Lig: 2016–
 TFF First League: 1988–97, 2014–16
 TFF Second League: 2004–14
 TFF Third League: 1984–88, 1997–04
 Amateur Level: 1948–84

Domestic season records

European competitions records

UEFA ranking history:

Honours
1. Lig
Play-off winner: 2015–16
2. Lig
Play-off winner: 2013–14
3. Lig
Champions: 1987–88, 2003–04
Turkish Cup
 Runners-up: 2019–20

Stadium

The Kırbıyık Holding Stadium is a multi-purpose stadium in Alanya, Turkey.  It is currently used mostly for football matches and is the home ground of Alanyaspor. The stadium was completed in 2011 and holds 10,842, all seated.

Players

Current squad

Other players under contract

Out on loan

Retired numbers

Club officials

Board members

Technical staff

References
Footnotes

Citation

External links

Official website
Alanyaspor on TFF.org

 
1948 establishments in Turkey
Alanya
Association football clubs established in 1948
Football clubs in Turkey
Sport in Antalya
Süper Lig clubs